Talampaya National Park is a national park located in the east/centre of La Rioja Province, Argentina. It was designated a provincial reserve in 1975, a national park in 1997, and a UNESCO World Heritage Site in 2000.

Location
The park protects an area of the High Monte ecoregion.
Its purpose is to protect important archaeological and palaeontological sites found in the area. It has landscapes of great beauty, with flora and fauna typical of the mountain biome.

The park is in a basin between the Cerro Los Colorados to the west and the Sierra de Sañagasta to the east. The landscape is the result of erosion by water and wind in a desert climate, with large ranges in temperature - high heat by day and low temperature at night, with torrential rain in summer and strong wind in spring.

Features

The park includes:

The dry bed of the Talampaya River, where dinosaurs lived millions of years ago - fossils, whilst not as interesting as Ischigualasto, have been found here;
The remains of indigenous peoples' settlements, such as the petroglyphs of the Puerta del Cañón;
A botanical garden of the local flora at the narrow point of the canyon;
Regional fauna, including guanacos, hares, maras, foxes and condors.

Gallery

References

External links

Official park website

Archaeological sites in Argentina
National parks of Argentina
World Heritage Sites in Argentina
Protected areas of La Rioja Province, Argentina
Protected areas established in 1997
High Monte